Jawahir is a female name of Arabic origin. It translates as "jewels".

Given name
Jawahir Ahmed, Somali model
Jawahir Roble, Somali-born British football referee
Jawahir Shah, Indian cricketer
Jawahir Thontowi, Indonesian academic
Jawaher bint Hamad bin Suhaim Al Thani, Qatari Sheikha, Consort to the Emir of Qatar

See also
Yasmin (given name)

References

Arabic feminine given names